Hertfordshire County Council is the upper-tier local authority for the non-metropolitan county of Hertfordshire, in England, the United Kingdom. After the 2021 election, it consists of 78 councillors, and is controlled by the Conservative Party, which has 46 councillors, versus 23 Liberal Democrats, 7 Labour councillors, 2 Green Party (UK) councillor and 1 Independent councillors.  It is a member of the East of England Local Government Association.

Composition

Elections are held every four years, interspersed by three years of elections to the ten district councils in the county.

Conservative candidates represent most of the county's rural areas, and almost all of eastern Hertfordshire is Conservative-controlled. St Albans, Three Rivers and Watford are Liberal Democrat strong areas, whilst Stevenage is Labour's strongest area.  All seats in the district of Broxbourne are represented by Conservative councillors.

Cabinet
The Cabinet consists of the Leader of the Council and other Executive Members.

Council history

Notes

References

External links

 Official Hertfordshire County Council website
 Official Hertfordshire County Council careers website

 
County council
Organisations based in Hertfordshire
County councils of England
Local authorities in Hertfordshire
1889 establishments in England
Local education authorities in England
Major precepting authorities in England
Leader and cabinet executives